Subhan (Arabic: سبحان sub·ḥān) is an Arabic male given name meaning "praise, exalted, glory".

It may refer to:

Subhan Quli Qutb Shah (born 1543), the third Sultan of Qutb Shahi dynasty in southern India
Subhan Ali Khan Kamboh (born 1766), an Indian Muslim scholar from Bareilly in northern India
Subhan Bakhsh (died 1799), Nawab of Masulipatam in northern India
Subhan Qureshi (born 1959), a biologist from Khyber Pakhtunkhwa, Pakistan
Subhan Raza Khan, former head of the Sufi center Dargah-e-Ala Hazrat in Bareilly, India
Abdul Subhan Qureshi, or Abdus Subhan (born 1972), a fugitive from India wanted on terrorism charges

See also
Subhan'allah, an Arabic phrase meaning "Glory to God"

Arabic given names